Clement or Clément is a French and English given name and surname, a form of the Late Latin name Clemens. People with those given names or surnames include:

Given name (chronological order) 

 Pope Clement (disambiguation), any of at least 14 real Popes and two Antipopes, beginning with Pope Clement I (died 99 or 101)
 Clement of Alexandria (died c. 217), a father of the Christian church, titled "St."
 Clement, bishop of Zaragoza ca. 326
 Clement of Metz (4th century), first bishop of Metz
 Clement, an alternative name for Aurelius Prudentius Clemens, Christian poet (348–c. 413)
 Clement of Ireland (born c. 750), titled "St.", active in the Paris Schools
 Clement of Ohrid (died 916), titled "St."
 Clement of Dunblane (died 1258), bishop of Dunblane
 Clement Victor Gunaratna (died 2000), Sri Lankan Sinhala government minister
 Clément Marot (died 1544), French poet
 Clément Michu (1936-2016), French actor
 Clement Cruttwell (1743–1808), English mapmaker
 Clement Clarke Moore (1779–1863), American poet and author of A Visit from St. Nicholas
 Clement Freud (1924-2009), politician, writer, comedian and grandson of Sigmund Freud
 Clement, nom de guerre of Eugène Chavant in the French resistance during World War II
 Clément Rodier (1829–1904), French missionary in Algeria & fruit breeder for whom the clementine was named
Clement Higgins (1844–1916), British politician
 Clement Attlee (1883–1967), Prime Minister of UK (1945–1951)
 Clement Greenberg (1909–1994), American art critic
 Clement Haynsworth (1912–1989), American judge
 Clement Cheng (21st century), Canadian-Hong Kong film director
 Clément Chantôme (1987–), French footballer
 Clement Ivanov (1990–), Estonian Dota 2 player
 Clement Matthews (1889–1915), English footballer

Surname 
 Adolphe Clément-Bayard, 19th century French industrialist
 Aeron Clement (1936-1989) Welsh science-fiction author
 Albéric Clément (1165–1191) First Marshal of France
 Albert Clément (1883–1907), racing driver, participant in the first French Grand Prix in 1906
 Alberto Vallarino Clement (born 1951), Panamanian engineer
 Amanda Clement (1888–1971), American baseball umpire
 Anthony Clement (born 1976), American football player
 Anthony Clement of Saxony
 Arnaud Clément, French tennis player
 Aurore Clément, French actor
 Bill Clement (born 1950), Canadian ice hockey player and broadcaster
 Bill Clement (rugby union) (1915–2007), Welsh rugby international
 Bob Clement, American politician
 Charles Clement (Wisconsin politician) (1815–1886), Wisconsin state senator
 Coralie Clément, French singer
 Dave Clement (1948–1982), English footballer
 Dick Clement, English writer and director
 Edith Brown Clement, American circuit court judge
 Edmond Clément (1867–1928), French tenor
 Ernie Clement (born 1996), American baseball player
 François Clément (1714–1793), French historian
 Frank G. Clement, Tennessee governor
 Franz Clement (1780–1842), Austrian violinist and composer
 Georges Clément, French athlete in 1900 Olympics
 Gilles Clément, French garden designer, writer, botanist
 Gregory Clement (1594–1660), English parliamentarian
 Hal Clement (born 1922), American writer
 Jack Clement (1931–2013), American singer, songwriter, record and film producer
 Jacques Clément (1567–1589), assassin of king
 James Clement, Austrialin rules footballer player
 Jean-Baptiste Clément, French author
 Jean-Pierre Clément (1809–1870), a French political economist and historian
 Jeff Clement, American baseball player
 Jemaine Clement, New Zealand actor, comedian
 Jennifer Clement Mexican-American writer
 Jérémy Clément, French football player
 Joseph Clement (1779-1844) British industrialist
 Josephine Dobbs Clement, American politician and civil rights activist
 Kerron Clement, American athlete
 Lidia Klement (1937–1964), Soviet singer
 Lillian Exum Clement, North Carolina politician
 Linda Clement, Scottish field hockey player
 Martin W. Clement (1881–1966), American railroad business manager
 Matt Clement (born 1974), American baseball player
 Matt Clement (born 1988), Canadian professional wrestler better known as Tyler Breeze
 Neil Clement (born 1978), English footballer
 Nicolas Clément (1779–1841), French chemist
 Olivier Clement, French Eastern Orthodox theologian
 Pascal Clément, French jurist and politician
 Paul Clement 2004-2008),  American Solicitor-General
 Paul Clement (football coach) (born 1972), English football coach
 Philippe Clement, Belgian football coach
 René Clément, French film director
 Reynold Clement (1834–1905), English cricketer, soldier and racecourse administrator 
 Rod Clement, Canadian politician
 Roland Clement (1912–2015), American conservationist 
 Skipper Clement (1484–1536), Danish merchant, captain, privateer
 Stef Clement, Dutch cyclist
 Stephen Emmett Clement (1867–1947), Canadian politician
 Tony Clement, Canadian parliamentarian
 Travers Clement, executive secretary of the Socialist Party of America 
 William Clement (academic) (1707-1782), Irish academic
 William T. Clement (1894–1955), American soldier
 Wolfgang Clement (1940–2020), German politician

See also
 Clemens, a given name and surname
 Clement (disambiguation)
 Clementine (disambiguation)
 Clementine (given name)
 Saint Clement (disambiguation)
 Clements

French masculine given names